Gosztonyia is a monospecific genus of marine ray-finned fish belonging to the family Zoarcidae, the eelpouts. The only species in the genus is Gosztonyia antarctica which is known only from the Bellingshausen Sea of Antarctica.

References

Lycodinae
Monotypic fish genera
Fish of Antarctica
Fish described in 2008